The Alessi Brothers, also known as Alessi, are an American pop rock singer-songwriter duo who first came to international prominence with their 1977 hit single "Oh Lori". The duo are identical twin brothers, Billy and Bobby Alessi (born July 12, 1953, West Hempstead, New York).

Career
In their early teens, the brothers attended West Hempstead High School and formed the band The Country Gentlemen with schoolmate Don Droege and drummer Bob Pelicane. The band often played at a teen club called The Mod Scene and Long Island summer beach club gigs, as well as playing at other venues which included Murray the K's World in Roosevelt Field, the Raleigh Hotel in the Catskills, and The Café Wha? in Greenwich Village. The band released one 45 single entitled "Saturday Night" which was credited to William Alessi.

The Country Gentlemen in 1967 evolved into The Look and recorded the single "If I were A Carpenter" b/w "Can You Do" on Verve Records.

In 1970, the Alessis were working in the Broadway cast of Hair, when former Blues Magoos guitarist Peppy Castro joined the show. The three formed the band Barnaby Bye and, with Mike Ricciardella on drums, the band were signed to Atlantic Records and released albums in 1972 (Room to Grow) and 1973 (Touch). The next Barnaby Bye album (Thrice Upon a Time) was not released until 2008, after the band reformed.

After the early years with Barnaby Bye, the brothers continued writing, recording and performing as the duo, Alessi. In 1977, their song "Oh Lori" (from the 1976 album Alessi) reached no. 8 and spent 11 weeks in the UK Singles Chart, and became a Top Ten hit in seventeen more countries. In May 1982, "Put Away Your Love" (from the 1982 album Long Time Friends) reached No. 71 and spent four weeks in the US Billboard Hot 100. They also charted in Brazil with "Sad Songs" (from the album Alessi, 1976), "All for a Reason" (from the album All for a Reason, 1977) and "Forever" (recorded with Christopher Cross, from the album Long Time Friends, 1982).  The first four Alessi albums (1976–1979) were released on the A&M record label, with the fifth, Long Time Friends (1982) being on Quincy Jones's Qwest label.

In 1984, Alessi released the track "Savin' the Day" for the soundtrack to the film Ghostbusters; this soundtrack album was released on the Arista label and was nominated for a Grammy Award for the Best Album of Original Score Written for a Motion Picture or Television Special.

Over the years Alessi have arranged, produced and/or written releases for many artists including Paul McCartney, Deborah Gibson, Frankie Valli, Richie Havens, Olivia Newton-John and Christopher Cross. The brothers toured with Andy Gibb in his 1978/79 Shadow Dancing tour and contributed background vocals to albums such as Art Garfunkel's 1979 album Fate for Breakfast and the John Lennon and Yoko Ono album Milk and Honey. Their songs have been covered by artists including Peter Frampton and Rick Springfield and their songwriting and/or vocals have been featured in such films as The Main Event and Ghostbusters.

The brothers have had success working on jingles and advertisements for David Lucas and many mainstream consumer products in the United States.

In the 2000s, they resumed their touring and album-recording career as a duo, with the new albums being released on the Eden Roc/Pink Records label. They resumed touring and recording as part of the group Barnaby Bye and, in 2012, were inducted into the Long Island Music Hall of Fame.

The 2012 compilation album from the Late Night Tales series, Late Night Tales: Metronomy by UK band Metronomy included "Seabird". The song was later included in the music over the closing credits of Taika Waititi's 2016 adventure-comedy Hunt for the Wilderpeople, and 2021 comedy-drama series Resident Alien.

Discography

Albums
Alessi – (1976) – A&M
All for a Reason – (1977) – A&M
Driftin – (1978) – A&M
Words & Music – (1979) – A&M
Long Time Friends – (1982) – Qwest
Hello Everyone – (2003) – Eden Roc Records
Just Like That – (2006) – Eden Roc Records
Live! All Our Life – (2009) – Home of Jazz
Two of Us – (2012) – Eden Roc Records
Marathon Day – (2013) – Eden Roc Records
Water – (2018) – Eden Roc Records

SinglesNotes'''

Contributions to film soundtrack
1979: The Main Event – backing vocals on three tracks (Columbia)
1984: Ghostbusters – "Savin' the Day" (Arista)
2016: Hunt for the Wilderpeople'' – "Seabird"

In popular culture
Alessi (アレッシー Aresshī), a minor antagonist from the Japanese manga series Stardust Crusaders, draws his namesake from the duo.

See also
List of former A&M Records artists

References

External links
Discogs Artist page 
Official Alessi Brothers site
Official Barnaby Bye site

1953 births
Living people
American male singers
Songwriters from New York (state)
Musical groups from Long Island
American identical twins
Twin musical duos
American musical duos
American pop rock music groups
American soft rock music groups
Soft rock duos
American twins
A&M Records artists
Male musical duos
American male songwriters